2XL ATV Offroad is a racing video game developed by 2XL Games and released on October 8, 2009 for the iOS.

Gameplay
The game features 3 different track types to compete in: Nationals (outdoor tracks), Supercross and Freestyle (stunt tracks). It has an Arcade mode, which allows racing among any of the 16 available tracks, a Career mode (considered the main one), and a multiplayer mode through either Wi-Fi or Bluetooth. 

Each of the game's tracks varies in its design, from Rubicon (pines covered in snow) to Castle Rock (dust and cacti). Career mode has the player moving through a chain of 11 leagues, made of various events with track combinations. Unlocking the new vehicles, upgrading, or customization are not featured.

Offroad defaults to a tilt-based control system, with steering being handled by the device itself. There's an alternative included in virtual analogue stick control scheme. On-screen buttons are used for accelerating and brake, with some smaller buttons for performing tricks.

Reception
The game has a Metacritic score of 84% based on 5 critic reviews.

References

2009 video games
IOS games
Off-road racing video games